The Janesville Station of Janesville, Wisconsin was built in 2000, to serve as the terminus for the Lake Country Limited. Passenger service ceased only a year later, in 2001. As of 2021, nothing remains of the station.

The condition of the tracks meant that the train stopped two miles from downtown Janesville, because to go farther would have added 20 minutes. Instead, Amtrak created a temporary station on the east side of the city in an area formerly used for grain loading. The station's amenities consisted of a passenger platform, lighting, and a gravel parking lot.

Originally, service to the station was daily, but this was reduced to weekends only in March 2001, before service completely ceased in September 2001.

References

External links
Janesville, Wisconsin – TrainWeb

Railway stations in the United States opened in 2000
2000 establishments in Wisconsin
Former Amtrak stations in Wisconsin
Railway stations closed in 2001
Demolished railway stations in the United States
Former railway stations in Wisconsin